Britta Hofmann (born 25 February 1980) is a German journalist and television presenter.

Early life and education 
Britta Hofmann was born in Attendorn in the region of North Rhine-Westphalia, and spent her first three years of her life in her hometown. She then moved to Hamm with her father, where she spent the rest of her childhood. After graduating with her Abitur in 1999, she studied from 2000 to 2005 and graduated with a sports science diploma at the German Sport University Cologne.

Television career 
After completing her studies, Hofmann completed a traineeship at N-tv from 2006 to 2008, where in addition to sports she also presented the news on the program. From 2005 to 2011, she was a sports presenter of the daily news on the same channel. In addition to presenting, she also worked as a live reporter, where she reported for example on N-tv and RTL Television for the 2008 Summer Olympics in Beijing and the 2010 Winter Olympics in Vancouver. At the end of 2011, she joined the channel Sky Deutschland, where she mainly works as a presenter for Sky Sport News HD, but since the 2012–13 season she also worked for Sky Sport at the football Bundesliga as a field reporter. Since the beginning of the 2015–16 season, she presents the UEFA Europa League on Sky.

External links 
Official website 

1980 births
Living people
German journalists
German women journalists
German television presenters
German women television presenters
People from Olpe (district)